Daegu KAPEC FC was a South Korean association football club based in the city of Daegu. It was a member of the K3 League in 2007, but withdrew from the league when unable to find a suitable home venue for the 2008 season.

Club records

External links
 Daegu KAPEC FC Daum cafe 

K3 League (2007–2019) clubs
Sport in Daegu
C
Association football clubs established in 2004
Association football clubs disestablished in 2008
2004 establishments in South Korea
2008 disestablishments in South Korea